The 1994 Cork Intermediate Football Championship was the 59th staging of the Cork Intermediate Football Championship since its establishment by the Cork County Board in 1909. The draw for the opening round fixtures took place on 12 December 1993.

The final was played on 25 September 1994 at Páirc Uí Chaoimh in Cork, between Ballincollig and Clyda Rovers, in what was their first ever meeting in a final. Ballincollig won the match by 2–07 to 2–04 to claim their first ever championship title.

Ballincollig's Podsie O'Mahony was the championship's top scorer with 4–13.

Results

First round

Second round

Quarter-finals

Semi-finals

Final

Championship statistics

Top scorers

Top scorers overall

In a single game

References

Cork Intermediate Football Championship